Campynemanthe  is a genus of plants in the Campynemataceae family, first described by Henri Baillon in 1893. The entire genus is endemic to New Caledonia in the southwestern Pacific. Its closest relative is the monotypic genus Campynema from Tasmania, sole other genus of the family.

List of species 
 Campynemanthe neocaledonica (Rendle) Goldblatt
 Campynemanthe parva Goldblatt 1986
 Campynemanthe viridiflora Baill. 1893

References

Bibliography

 
 

Liliales genera
Liliales
Endemic flora of New Caledonia
Taxa named by Henri Ernest Baillon